On 20 February 2016, 4 Lashkar-e-Taiba terrorists armed with AK-47 Assault rifles, UBGL, hand grenades, and explosives attacked a CRPF convoy on the main road linking Srinagar to Jammu, killing two police men and a civilian. The militants then took refuge in the government-run multi-story "Entrepreneurship Development Institute" in Pampore.  
Units of the Indian Army and Central Reserve Police Force cordoned off the building and launched a joint operation to evacuate civilians from the building. For Security forces, their main focus was to evacuate civilians to safety. Army and CRPF launched a joint operation with armored vehicles to evacuate 120 civilians from the building. The militants responded with automatic gunfire and hand grenades. During the ensuing battle, three soldiers from Indian Army lost their lives. Captain Pawan Kumar from 10 Para Special Forces, Captain Tushar Mahajan & Lance Naik Om Prakash from 9 Para Special Forces lost their life. Capt. Pawan Kumar from Army's  10 Para Special Forces unit lost his life on the first day during the firefight, a terrorist was also killed in the firefight. After the firefight part of the EDI building caught on fire.

The next day, Special Forces operatives launched a final assault against the militants held up in the EDI building. Reconnaissance drones were used in preparation for the assault. The 48-hour stand-off ended with the deaths of all three of the remaining militants. Two soldiers Capt. Tushar Mahajan and Lance Naik Om Prakash from 9 Para Special Forces lost their lives on the same day.

See also 
List of terrorist incidents, January–June 2016

References

Mass murder in 2016
21st-century mass murder in India
Terrorist incidents in India in 2016
February 2016 crimes in Asia
February 2016 events in India